A Choralschola, known simply as schola, is a choir for singing Gregorian chant or plainsong. It consists traditionally of only men, but more recent groups sometimes also include female voices. A schola often performs in uniform.

Chant singing is usually responsorial, responses being sung by cantor. the congregation or by groups within the schola. Parts of the liturgy sung by the schola include the ordinary, and the changing parts Introit, Psalms, Sequence, Tract, calls to the gospel and the offertory, and Gradual.

Traditionally the schola performs without accompaniment. After the Second Vatican Council, the frequency of Latin liturgy was reduced and is less known. Therefore organ accompaniment has been used to support the singing.

A Choralschola is one of singing groups in the oratorio Laudato si', composed in 2016 by Peter Reulein on a libretto by Helmut Schlegel and aimed at showing the diversity of church music, the others being soloists, a children's choir and a mixed choir.

References

External links 
 Choralscholen stellen sich vor (list of groups, in German) Internationale Gesellschaft für Studien des Gregorianischen Chorals

Church music
Western plainchant